Ogra ( or colloquially Ugra,) is a commune in Mureș County, Transylvania, Romania. It is composed of five villages: Dileu Vechi (Oláhdellő), Giuluș (Gyulas), Lăscud (Lackod), Ogra, and Vaideiu (Mezőújfalu).

The commune is situated on the Transylvanian Plateau, on the banks of the Mureș River. It is located in the southwestern part of the county,  from the county seat, Târgu Mureș. The A3 motorway connects Ogra to Brașov (Cristian),  to the southeast and Cluj-Napoca (Gilău),  to the northwest.

As of 2011, the commune had a population of 2,387, consisting of 45.3% Romanians, 29.2% Roma, and 21.3% Hungarians.

The  was built in the 17th century in the Baroque style. It was nationalized by the Communist authorities in 1949, and served for a while as a school and then town hall; since 2011 it functions as a hotel and restaurant.

The Ogra mine is a salt mine located on the territory of the commune.

See also
List of Hungarian exonyms (Mureș County)

References

Communes in Mureș County
Localities in Transylvania